This is a list of museums in Fiji.

Museums in Fiji 
Fiji Museum
21K Gallery
La Galerie
Bilo Battery
Gallery Gondwana Fiji

See also 

 List of museums

 
Museums
Fiji
Fiji